Keng-Kyuyol is the name of several rural localities in the Sakha Republic, Russia.
Keng-Kyuyol, Abyysky District, Sakha Republic, a selo in Uolbutsky Rural Okrug of Abyysky District
Keng-Kyuyol, Verkhnevilyuysky District, Sakha Republic, a selo in Surguluksky Rural Okrug of Verkhnevilyuysky District